Sulz may refer to:

Austria
Sulz, Vorarlberg, a municipality the district of Feldkirch, Vorarlberg
Sulz im Weinviertel, a town  the district of Gänserndorf, Lower Austria

Germany
Sulz am Neckar, a town in Baden-Württemberg
Sulz (Altmühl), a river of Bavaria, Germany

Switzerland
Soulce, a former municipality in the canton of Jura, formerly known as Sulz
Sulz, Aargau, a former municipality in the canton of Aargau
Sulz, Lucerne a former municipality in the canton of Lucerne

Ukraine
Sulz, Ukraine, village in the Mykolaiv Raion within the Mykolaiv Oblast

See also 
 Salz (disambiguation)
 Selz (disambiguation)
 Sülz (disambiguation)